Etchu Tabe (born July 12, 1986) is a Cameroonian-born American soccer player who plays as a defender or striker for Ekenäs IF. At 14, Tabe attended Baldwin High School after moving to Georgia, U.S., from Buea, Cameroon, where his father was a professional soccer player.

Career

College career
Tabe played defender during his two years at Brewton-Parker College in Mt. Vernon, Georgia. He transferred to Georgia Southwestern State University, where during his first year as a junior he led the team in goals scored.  Tabe set a Georgia Southwestern record for goals and points with 10 and 26, respectively, on his way to being named to the All-Conference team for the Peach Belt Conference.

Professional career
On January 11, 2008, Tabe signed with Ljungskile SK.

In the 2008 season, Tabe made 19 appearances for LSK, and 24 (22 league) appearances in 2009. In February 2010, Tabe signed with the Finnish Ykkönen club RoPS. For the 2011 season, the team was promoted to Veikkausliiga, where Tabe made 23 appearances and scored one goal. The team was, however, relegated back to Ykkönen, and Tabe signed a contract with another Veikkausliiga team, KuPS, for the 2012 season.

Sources

External links 
 mlfsports.com 
 etchutabe.wordpress.com
 

1986 births
Living people
People from Buea
American soccer players
Cameroonian footballers
Cameroonian emigrants to the United States
Brewton–Parker College alumni
Georgia Southwestern State University alumni
American expatriate soccer players
Cameroonian expatriate footballers
Expatriate footballers in Sweden
Expatriate footballers in Finland
Rovaniemen Palloseura players
Kuopion Palloseura players
Veikkausliiga players
People from Milledgeville, Georgia
Soccer players from Georgia (U.S. state)
Cameroonian expatriate sportspeople in Finland
Ekenäs IF players
FC Haka players
Association football defenders